Vallecito (Spanish for "Little Valley") is a census-designated place (CDP) in Calaveras County, California, United States. The population was 442 at the 2010 census, up from 427 at the 2000 census. The town is registered as California Historical Landmark #273. Nearby is Moaning Cavern, the largest cave chamber in California, which the Miwok Indians used as a burial ground.

History
Vallecito was one of California's important early-day mining towns. Gold was discovered here by the Murphy brothers in 1849, and it was originally called "Murphys Diggings," which became "Murphys Old Diggings" when they moved on to greener pastures at "Murphys New Diggings" (which became the town of Murphys). The town was revitalized in 1852 when extremely rich deposits of gold were discovered running practically through the center of town. A post office was established in 1854, which is still in use today.

The Vallecito Bell, cast at Troy, New York in 1853, was brought around Cape Horn. It was purchased from the ship with funds contributed by early-day residents and brought to Vallecito to be erected in a large oak tree in 1854. It was used to call the people together until February 16, 1939, when a severe wind blew the old tree down.

The first post office opened in 1854 as Vallicita; the town's name was changed to Vallecito in 1940.

Geography

Demographics

2010
The 2010 United States Census reported that Vallecito had a population of 442. The racial makeup of Vallecito was 398 (90.0%) White, 0 (0.0%) African American, 6 (1.4%) Native American, 11 (2.5%) Asian, 1 (0.2%) Pacific Islander, 5 (1.1%) from other races, and 21 (4.8%) from two or more races. Hispanic or Latino of any race were 33 persons (7.5%).

The Census reported that 442 people (100% of the population) lived in households, 0 (0%) lived in non-institutionalized group quarters, and 0 (0%) were institutionalized.

There were 193 households, out of which 53 (27.5%) had children under the age of 18 living in them, 98 (50.8%) were opposite-sex married couples living together, 25 (13.0%) had a female householder with no husband present, 6 (3.1%) had a male householder with no wife present.  There were 9 (4.7%) unmarried opposite-sex partnerships, and 0 (0%) same-sex married couples or partnerships. 54 households (28.0%) were made up of individuals, and 21 (10.9%) had someone living alone who was 65 years of age or older. The average household size was 2.29.  There were 129 families (66.8% of all households); the average family size was 2.77.

The population was spread out, with 84 people (19.0%) under the age of 18, 22 people (5.0%) aged 18 to 24, 94 people (21.3%) aged 25 to 44, 165 people (37.3%) aged 45 to 64, and 77 people (17.4%) who were 65 years of age or older.  The median age was 47.7 years. For every 100 females, there were 87.3 males.  For every 100 females age 18 and over, there were 82.7 males.

There were 217 housing units at an average density of 25.3 per square mile (9.8/km), of which 193 were occupied, of which 138 (71.5%) were owner-occupied, and 55 (28.5%) were occupied by renters. The homeowner vacancy rate was 0.7%; the rental vacancy rate was 6.8%.  321 people (72.6% of the population) lived in owner-occupied housing units and 121 people (27.4%) lived in rental housing units.

2000
As of the census of 2000, there were 427 people, 183 households, and 120 families residing in the CDP. There were 195 housing units at an average density of 22.8 per square mile (8.8/km). The racial makeup of the CDP was 95.55% White, 0.23% Black or African American, 3.04% Native American, 0.47% Asian, 0.47% from other races, and 0.23% from two or more races.  1.87% of the population were Hispanic or Latino of any race.

There were 183 households, out of which 26.8% had children under the age of 18 living with them, 54.1% were married couples living together, 8.7% had a female householder with no husband present, and 34.4% were non-families. 26.2% of all households were made up of individuals, and 9.3% had someone living alone who was 65 years of age or older.  The average household size was 2.33 and the average family size was 2.83.

In the CDP, the population was spread out, with 22.2% under the age of 18, 5.6% from 18 to 24, 25.8% from 25 to 44, 32.8% from 45 to 64, and 13.6% who were 65 years of age or older.  The median age was 44 years. For every 100 females, there were 102.4 males.  For every 100 females age 18 and over, there were 97.6 males.

The median income for a household in the CDP was $36,875, and the median income for a family was $32,917. Males had a median income of $46,250 versus $37,917 for females. The per capita income for the CDP was $18,779.  About 11.6% of families and 16.6% of the population were below the poverty line, including 32.0% of those under age 18 and 8.2% of those age 65 or over.

Politics

See also
Twisted Oak Winery

References

External links

Census-designated places in Calaveras County, California
California Historical Landmarks
Census-designated places in California